VA-76 has the following meanings:
VA-76 (U.S. Navy)
State Route 76 (Virginia)